Ishmael Mhaladi is a Botswanan Olympic middle-distance runner. He represented his country in the men's 1500 meters at the 1980 Summer Olympics. His time was a 3:59.04.

References

External links
 

1948 births
Living people
Botswana male middle-distance runners
Olympic athletes of Botswana
Athletes (track and field) at the 1980 Summer Olympics